Emisire Shahan (14 August 1843 - 17 November 1919, also known as Amaziah Shahan) was a sergeant in the United States Army who was awarded the Presidential Medal of Honor for gallantry during the American Civil War. Shahan was awarded the medal on 3 May 1865 for actions performed at the Battle of Sailor's Creek in Virginia on 6 April 1865.

Personal life 
Shahan was born on 14 August 1843 in Preston County, West Virginia to parents Samuel Shahan and Rebecca Wolfe. He was one of 3 siblings and 3 half-siblings fathered by Samuel Shahan. He married Rebecca Miller (1846-1886) in 1864 and Melvina H. Knight (1850-1929) in 1894, fathering a total of 9 children with Miller. He died on 17 November 1919 in Satsop, Washington and was buried in Masonic Cemetery in Elma, Washington.

Military service 
Shahan enlisted in the Army as a corporal on 1 July 1861 in Clarksburg, West Virginia and was mustered in to Company A of the 1st West Virginia Cavalry. On 6 May 1865, at the Battle of Sailor's Creek in Virginia, Shahan captured the flag of the Confederate 76th Georgia Infantry.

Shahan's Medal of Honor citation reads:

References 

1843 births
1919 deaths
People from Preston County, West Virginia
United States Army Medal of Honor recipients
American Civil War recipients of the Medal of Honor
Union Army soldiers
Military personnel from West Virginia

External links